Eric Lafon Heatherly (born February 21, 1970) is an American singer. In 2000, he debuted with a cover of The Statler Brothers' "Flowers on the Wall", the first of three singles from his debut album Swimming in Champagne, which was issued in 2000 on Mercury Nashville Records. A second album for Mercury was planned in 2001 but not released, due to the label's restructuring.

By 2002, he had signed to DreamWorks Nashville, where he recorded a third studio album which was also unreleased. His fourth overall album, and second to be released, was 2005's The Lower East Side of Life, issued on his own NashVegas Records label.

Biography
Eric Heatherly was born February 21, 1970, in Chattanooga, Tennessee. Influenced at an early age by country rock acts such as Creedence Clearwater Revival, Eric wrote his first song at 8. Throughout his teenage years, Heatherly played guitar in several bands in the Chattanooga area.

He later moved to Nashville, Tennessee, where he gained a following as a musician, as well as endorsements for guitar manufacturers Fender Musical Instruments Corporation and Takamine Guitars. At the 1997 Country Music Association awards show, Heatherly also played lead guitar in Shania Twain's band.

Musical career
In 2000, Heatherly was signed to Mercury Nashville Records as a recording artist. His debut single was a cover version of The Statler Brothers' 1965 debut single "Flowers on the Wall". Heatherly's rendition was a Top Ten hit on the Billboard Hot Country Singles & Tracks chart, peaking at #6 in mid-2000.

The song served as the first single from his debut album. Entitled Swimming in Champagne, the album was co-produced by Keith Stegall. Due to a restructuring of Mercury Nashville's parent company, Swimming in Champagne received minimal promotion; its second and third singles peaked at #46 and at #32 on the chart. Heatherly had also recorded a second album for Mercury, but it was not released, and Heatherly was dropped from the label by 2002.

A month after parting ways with Mercury, Heatherly signed to DreamWorks Records' Nashville division. His third album, to be titled Sometimes It's Just Your Time, was to have been released in late 2002. Its lead-off single ("The Last Man Committed") entered the country music chart; although promotional advance copies of the album, Sometimes It's Just Your Time, had been issued, it was ultimately unreleased as well.

Three years after his departure from DreamWorks's roster, he founded a personal label named NashVegas Records, with Koch Records serving as distributor. His fourth album overall (but only the second to be released), The Lower East Side of Life, was issued in 2005, though no singles were released from it.

After The Lower East Side of Life, Heatherly continued to tour, in addition to manufacturing custom-made guitar straps. Through the help of songwriter and producer Carson Chamberlain, Heatherly recorded a song called "Unforgettable", which appeared in an episode of Grey's Anatomy. He has also recorded another album, 2 High 2 Cry, released in 2009. A second self-released album, Painkillers, followed in 2010.

Discography

Albums

Notes
A^ Swimming in Champagne also peaked at number 6 on the RPM Country Albums chart in Canada.

Singles

Notes
A^ "Flowers on the Wall" also peaked at number 3 on the RPM Country Tracks chart in Canada.

Music videos

External links 
 AGR Television Records International Record Label of Eric Heatherly (multi-lingual)

References

1970 births
American country guitarists
American country rock singers
American male guitarists
American country singer-songwriters
Living people
People from Chattanooga, Tennessee
Mercury Records artists
DreamWorks Records artists
Singer-songwriters from Tennessee
Guitarists from Tennessee
Country musicians from Tennessee
21st-century American male singers
21st-century American singers
21st-century American guitarists
American male singer-songwriters
American rockabilly guitarists